The 2005–06 Scottish Premier League was won by Celtic, with a 17-point margin over their nearest challengers Hearts in the first season under the management of Gordon Strachan. Rangers, who finished third, failed to finish a Scottish top flight campaign as champions or runners-up for the first time since 1988.

As league champions, Celtic qualified for the UEFA Champions League, with runners-up Hearts also qualifying. This marked the first time since 1995 that a club outside the Old Firm of Celtic and Rangers finished in the top two. Third-placed Rangers qualified for the UEFA Cup, as did Scottish Second Division champions Gretna, who took the Scottish Cup place despite losing the final to Hearts.

Livingston were relegated, and Scottish First Division winners St Mirren were promoted.

Kris Boyd was the top scorer with 32 goals (17 for Rangers after 15 for Kilmarnock).

Teams

Promotion and relegation from 2004–05
Promoted from First Division to Premier League
Falkirk

Relegated from Premier League to First Division
Dundee

Stadia and locations

Personnel

Managerial changes

League table

Results

Matches 1–22
During matches 1–22 each team played every other team twice (home and away).

Matches 23–33
During matches 23–33 each team played every other team once (either at home or away).

Matches 34–38
During matches 34–38 each team played every other team in their half of the table once.

Top six

Bottom six

Top scorers

Source: SPL official website

Attendances
The average attendances for SPL clubs during the 2005/06 season are shown below:

Source: SPL official website

Monthly awards

References

Scottish Premier League seasons
1
Scot